Civic Union may refer to:
Civic Union (Argentina)
Civic Union (Latvia)
Civic Union (Russia)
Civic Union (Uruguay)
Civic Union Party, a political party in Peru